Senator Cooke may refer to:

Alec Cooke, Baron Cooke of Islandreagh (1920–2007), Northern Irish Senate
Charles A. Cooke (1848–1917), North Carolina State Senate
Charles M. Cooke (1844–1920), North Carolina State Senate
John H. Cooke (1911–1998), New York State Senate
John Cooke (Colorado politician) (fl. 2000s–2010s), Colorado State Senate
Lorrin A. Cooke (1831–1902), Connecticut State Senate
Walter E. Cooke (1910–1982), New York State Senate

See also
Senator Cook (disambiguation)